Buad may refer to:
 Buad Island, Samar Province, Philippines
 Buad (barangay), Lumbatan, Lanao del Sur, Philippines